This is a list of yearly Northwest Conference football standings.

Northwest Conference standings

Early history

Modern era

References

 
 

Northwest Conference
Northwest Conference
Standings